The 131st Regiment of Foot was an infantry regiment of the British Army, created in 1793 and disbanded in 1796. The regiment was raised by General Henry Edward Fox, with the colonelcy being transferred to Lowther Pennington, 2nd Baron Muncaster shortly thereafter.

References

External links

Infantry regiments of the British Army
Military units and formations established in 1793
Military units and formations disestablished in 1796
1793 establishments in Great Britain
1796 disestablishments in Great Britain